Holy Name of Jesus Parish is a church in Stamford, Connecticut, United States, founded on July 19, 1903. It is one of the Polish-American Roman Catholic parishes in New England in the Diocese of Bridgeport. Holy Name of Jesus Church is the second oldest Catholic Church in Stamford.

History 
The first building acquired by the parish was the 1852 Duncan Phyfe House, located at 4 Pulaski Street.  This fine Italianate house was home to Duncan Phyfe, a noted cabinetmaker.  The existing church was built in 1925 to plans supplied by architect Henry F. Ludorf of Hartford, Connecticut.  The parochial school, which had been closed, was re-opened by the Bernadine Sisters from Reading, Pennsylvania. Work on Holy Name of Jesus started on April 5, 1925. The same year, on August 23, Bishop Nilan consecrated the cornerstone of the church. On Easter Sunday, 1927 the mass was celebrated in the lower part of the church because the upper church was not completed. The work was slow, but steady. Following the financial crash of 1929, the Rev. Wladasz continued work on the church. On December 25, 1934 the first mass was celebrated in the completed upper portion of the church.

The parochial school, located just west of the church, was built in 1929, and the convent, on the other side of the church, was added in 1956.  The entire complex was listed on the National Register of Historic Places in 1987.

Pastors
Rev. Fr. Zdislaw Luczycki (1903 to 1906)
Rev. Fr. Ignacy Krusinski (1906 to 1910)
Rev. Fr. Jozef Raniszewski (1910 to 1917)
Rev. Fr. Ludwik Rusin (1917 to 1922)
Rt. Rev. Msgr. Francis Wladasz (1922 to 1959)
Rev. Fr. Felix Werpechowski (1959 to 1971)
Rt. Rev. Msgr. Alphonse Fiedorczyk (1971 to 1985)
Rev. Fr. Stanley Koziol (1985 to 1987)
Rev. Fr. Sherman Gray (1987 to 2003)
Rev. Fr. Stanislaw Stanieszewski C.M. (2003 to 2008)
Rev. Fr. Eugene Kotlinski C.M. (2008 to 2012)
Rev. Fr. Pawel M. Hrebenko (2012–Present)

See also
National Register of Historic Places listings in Stamford, Connecticut

References

Bibliography 
 
 
 
 The Official Catholic Directory in USA

External links 
 Holy Name of Jesus - Official Website
 Holy Name of Jesus - Diocesan Information
 Roman Catholic Diocese of Bridgeport

Roman Catholic parishes of Diocese of Bridgeport
Polish-American Roman Catholic parishes in Connecticut
Roman Catholic churches completed in 1925
20th-century Roman Catholic church buildings in the United States
Roman Catholic churches in Stamford, Connecticut
Churches on the National Register of Historic Places in Connecticut
Italianate architecture in Connecticut
Romanesque Revival church buildings in Connecticut
National Register of Historic Places in Fairfield County, Connecticut
1852 establishments in Connecticut
Italianate church buildings in the United States